Fabien Joseph Frankel (born 6 April 1994) is a British actor. He is known for his role as Ser Criston Cole in the HBO fantasy drama series House of the Dragon (2022–).

Early life
Frankel was born at Chelsea and Westminster Hospital in West London to English actor Mark Frankel and French-Italian advertising executive Caroline Besson. His paternal grandmother was from a Jewish family from India and Iraq, and his paternal grandfather's family were Jewish emigrants from Poland and Russia to London's East End. Frankel's father died in a road accident when he was two, while his mother was pregnant with his younger brother Max. The two brothers were raised in London by their mother, and spoke French at home. She introduced them to film by taking them to the cinema once a week.

Frankel took a year-long Foundation Course at the Royal Academy of Dramatic Art (RADA) before going on to graduate with a Bachelor of Arts in Professional Acting from the London Academy of Music and Dramatic Art (LAMDA) in 2017.

Career
Frankel's career began on stage in the 2017 production of The Knowledge at Charing Cross Theatre. He made his onscreen debut in 2019 in the romantic comedy film Last Christmas. That same year, he was cast as the lead Theo Sipowicz in a pilot for a potential NYPD Blue spin-off series on ABC.

In 2021, Frankel appeared as Dominique Renelleau in the BBC One and Netflix true crime drama The Serpent. Frankel was named a 2021 Brit to Watch by Variety. As of 2022, he plays Ser Criston Cole, a knight from the Dornish Marches, in the HBO fantasy series House of the Dragon, a prequel to Game of Thrones and adaptation of George R. R. Martin's 2018 fictional history book Fire and Blood. Frankel also starred opposite Greta Bellamacina in the independent romance film Venice at Dawn.

Filmography

Stage

References

External links
 
 Fabien Frankel at Curtis Brown
 Fabien Frankel on Instagram

Living people
1994 births
21st-century English male actors
Alumni of the London Academy of Music and Dramatic Art
English male actors of South Asian descent
English male stage actors
English male television actors
English people of French descent
English people of Indian-Jewish descent
English people of Iraqi-Jewish descent
English people of Italian descent
English people of Polish-Jewish descent
English people of Russian-Jewish descent
Jewish English male actors
Male actors from London
People from Chelsea, London